Mastermind-like 3 (Drosophila) is a protein that in humans is encoded by the MAML3 gene.

References

Further reading